Osvát Szilágyi   (b.1436 - d. ?), was a Hungarian nobleman, member of the House of Szilágyi, son of Ladislaus Szilágyi and  Katalin Bellyéni, brother of Michael Szilágyi,  Regent of the Kingdom of Hungary, Erzsébet Szilágyi, Queen Mother of Hungary  and uncle of King Matthias Corvinus of Hungary, Croatia and Bohemia, Duke of Austria.

He married in 1448 Ágota Pósa de Szer (also known as Ágota Szeri-Pósa) daughter of Count Miklós Pósa de Szer, they had three children:
– Ferenc Szilágyi  
– Margit Szilágyi    
– Jusztina (Ilona), Princess Consort of Wallachia, wife of Vlad III the Impaler.

Ancestry

Sources
Fraknói Vilmos: Michael Szilágyi, The uncle of King Matthias (Bp., 1913)
W.Vityi Zoltán: King Matthias maternal relatives

References 

Osvat
Hungarian nobility